Gregory Ryan (13 March 1913 – 10 May 1986) was an Australian cricketer. He played one first-class match for New South Wales in 1934/35.

See also
 List of New South Wales representative cricketers

References

External links
 

1913 births
1986 deaths
Australian cricketers
New South Wales cricketers
Cricketers from Newcastle, New South Wales